How I Spent My Summer Vacation is a 1967 American film.

It was one of the first movies made for TV. It starred famous names who would later star in other TV movies and shows, including Robert Wagner and Jill St. John.

Plot
Man in hiding Jack Washington is contacted by another man named Lewis Gannet, who promises money and independence in exchange for a job. Sensing more than he is told, Jack investigates, with the trail leading to an old girl friend, her family, and danger.

Cast
Robert Wagner as Jack Washington
Peter Lawford as Ned Pine
Lola Albright as Mrs Pine
Walter Pidgeon as Lewis Gannet
Jill St. John as Nikki Pine
Michael Ansara as Pucci
Len Lesser as The Greek
Albert Morin as Jewelry Dealer
Ralph Smiley as Mr Amin
Tiger Joe Marsh as Yoshiro
Joni Webster as Miss Karali
Lyn Peters as The Interviewer

References

External links

1967 television films
1967 films
American television films